Dongdaemun A is a constituency of the National Assembly of South Korea. The constituency consists of part of Dongdaemun District, Seoul. As of 2016, 160,115 eligible voters were registered in the constituency.

List of members of the National Assembly

Election results

2020

2016

2012

2008

2004

2000

1996

1992

1988

References 

Constituencies of the National Assembly (South Korea)